The Gran Premio Comite Olimpico Nacional Femenino was an annual professional road bicycle race for women in Costa Rica.

Winners

References

Cycle races in Costa Rica
Recurring sporting events established in 2018
Women's road bicycle races
Annual sporting events in Costa Rica